Camplong is a commune in the Hérault department in southern France.

Personalities 
 Ferdinand Fabre spent part of his youth at the house of his uncle, who was curate of the parish.

Population

See also
Communes of the Hérault department

References

Communes of Hérault